The 2000 season was the eighth season of the J-League Division 1. The league began on March 11 and ended on November 26.
At the end of the season the second stage winner Kashima Antlers won the Suntory Championship against Yokohama F-Marinos who won the first stage.

Clubs
Following sixteen clubs participated in J.League Division 1 during 2000 season. Of these clubs, Kawasaki Frontale and FC Tokyo were promoted from Division 2.

 Avispa Fukuoka
 Kashima Antlers
 JEF United Ichihara
 Kashiwa Reysol
 FC Tokyo
 Tokyo Verdy 1969
 Yokohama F. Marinos
 Shimizu S-Pulse
 Jublio Iwata
 Nagoya Grampus Eight
 Cerezo Osaka
 Gamba Osaka
 Vissel Kobe
 Sanfrecce Hiroshima
 Kawasaki Frontale 
 FC Tokyo

Overview

First stage

Second stage

Suntory Championship

Overall table

References

1999
1
Japan
Japan